The Agora Theatre and Ballroom (commonly known as the Cleveland Agora, or simply, the Agora) is a music venue located in Cleveland, Ohio, founded by Henry "Hank" LoConti Sr.  The Agora name was used by two other Cleveland venues in succession, the latter of which was damaged by fire in 1984.  The current Agora venue, known as such since 1986, first opened in 1913 as the Metropolitan Theatre.

On December 29, 2011, the LoConti family donated the Agora to MidTown Cleveland Inc., a nonprofit organization.

History of the Agora

Cornell Road
The first Agora in Cleveland, informally referred to as Agora Alpha, opened on February 26, 1966, at 2175 Cornell Road in Little Italy near the campus of Case Western Reserve University.

East 24th Street
In 1967, the Agora moved to a second building on East 24th Street near the campus of Cleveland State University. Once settled in their new location, the new Agora Ballroom, informally referred to as Agora Beta, played a role in giving exposure to many bands, both from the Cleveland area and abroad. Many artists such as Peter Frampton, Bruce Springsteen, Boston, Grand Funk Railroad, ZZ Top, Kiss and many others received much exposure after playing the Agora. The Agora Ballroom was also the setting of the concert by Paul Simon's character in the opening minutes of the 1980 movie One-Trick Pony. The front facade of the Agora Ballroom was temporarily swapped for the one shown in the movie. It is also one of three locations used to record Todd Rundgren's live album Back to the Bars in 1978.

The East 24th Street building also housed Agency Recording Studios, located above the Agora. The onsite recording studio and the close proximity to radio station WMMS allowed for high-quality live concert broadcasts from the Agora. Some of these concerts were later released commercially, including Bruce Springsteen's The Agora, Cleveland 1978, the Cars' Live at the Agora 1978, Ian Hunter's You're Never Alone with a Schizophrenic Deluxe Edition and Dwight Twilley Band's Live From Agora.

The popularity of the club led the Agora to expand during the 1970s and 1980s, opening 12 other clubs in the cities of Columbus, Toledo, Youngstown, Painesville, Akron,  Atlanta, Dallas, Houston, Tampa, Hallandale, Hartford, and New Haven. However, the Cleveland location is the only one still in existence today.

On May 3, 1982, the attendees at the Huey Lewis and the News concert inspired Huey Lewis to write the song, "The Heart of Rock & Roll."  Lewis was skeptical that the Cleveland rock scene was better than his home area of San Francisco, but the appreciation of the show and participation of the fans caused him to realize it was the heart of rock & roll.

In 1984, the Agora was damaged by a fire and closed. Two years later, the Agora reopened in a new location on Euclid Avenue, east of Downtown Cleveland. It has remained there since then, and today is still a popular concert club, with many national acts playing there when they stop in Cleveland.

History of 5000 Euclid Avenue

The building currently known as the Agora first opened on March 31, 1913, with an English performance of Aida as the Metropolitan Theatre. It was the brainchild of Max Faetkenheuer, an opera promoter and conductor who had also been involved in the construction of the monumental Hippodrome Theatre on Euclid Avenue five years earlier. The new opera house was well received and did well early on, but later struggled to stay profitable. Among various uses, the Metropolitan was home to a Cleveland's Yiddish theatre troupe in 1927. This brief episode in its history came to an end a few months later in 1928 after the troupe was involved in a bus accident on the way to a performance in Youngstown; the actors were too injured to perform and the venture went bankrupt. By 1932, the venue had turned into a vaudeville/burlesque house called "The Gayety," hosting "hoofers, comics and strippers." The Metropolitan returned to its original use for a short time during the mid-1940s staging comedic musicals, but by the end of the decade stage productions had ceased and the theatre became a full-time movie house. From 1951–78, the theater offices were home to radio stations WHK (1420 AM) and WMMS (100.7 FM); the theater itself was known as the WHK Auditorium.  In 1968–69 the theater was known as the Cleveland Grande. In the early 1980s, it briefly re-opened as the New Hippodrome Theatre showing movies.

Following the fire which damaged the Agora Ballroom on East 24th Street, club owner Henry LoConti, Sr. decided to move to the 5000 Euclid Avenue location.  Following extensive renovations, the new Agora Metropolitan Theater, the third Cleveland venue to bear the Agora name, opened in October 1986. The Agora has two rooms: a 500-person capacity, standing-room-only ballroom with adjoining bar, and an 1800-seat theater. It is available for rentals and hosts nationally touring acts. Plans are underway to reopen the Backstage Cafe.
The Agora is the host of Cleveland-based band Mushroomhead's annual Halloween show.

Henry LoConti Sr. died on July 8, 2014, at age 85.

Further reading

References

External links

Encyclopedia of Cleveland History: Agora Ballroom
ClevelandHistorical.org: Cleveland Agora
ClevelandRockAndRoll.com: Agora Ballroom
MidTown Cleveland Inc.
Hemingway Development

Event venues established in 1913
Music venues in Cleveland
1913 establishments in Ohio